Herbie Lewis (February 17, 1941 – May 18, 2007) was an American jazz double bassist. He played or recorded with Cannonball Adderley, Stanley Turrentine, Bobby Hutcherson, Freddie Hubbard, Harold Land, Jackie McLean, Archie Shepp, Tete Montoliu and McCoy Tyner.

Lewis founded the Jazz Studies program at New College of California. He died of cancer on May 18, 2007.

Discography

As sideman
With Cannonball Adderley
 Great Love Themes (Capitol, 1966)
 Money in the Pocket (Capitol, 2005)

With Art Farmer and Benny Golson
 Here and Now (Mercury, 1962)
 Another Git Together (Mercury, 1962)

With Freddie Hubbard
 High Blues Pressure (Atlantic, 1968)
 Echoes of Blue (Atlantic, 1976)
 Above & Beyond (Metropolitan, 1999)
 Fastball: Live at the Left Bank (Label M, 2001)

With Bobby Hutcherson
 Stick-Up! (Blue Note, 1968)
 Now! (Blue Note, 1970)
 Solo / Quartet (Contemporary, 1982)
 Nice Groove (Baystate, 1984)
 Four Seasons (Timeless, 1985)

With Les McCann
 Les McCann Ltd. in San Francisco (Pacific Jazz, 1961)
 Pretty Lady (Pacific Jazz, 1961)
 Les McCann Sings (Pacific Jazz, 1961)
 Les McCann Ltd. in New York (Pacific Jazz, 1962)
 Les McCann Ltd. Plays the Shampoo (Pacific Jazz, 1963)
 Oh Brother! (Fontana, 1964)
 A Bag of Gold (Pacific Jazz, 1966)
 From the Top of the Barrel (Pacific Jazz, 1967)
 New from the Big City (Pacific Jazz, 1970)
 Django (United Artists, 1975)
 Pump It Up (Cream, 2002)

With Jackie McLean
 Let Freedom Ring (Blue Note, 1963)
 Consequence (Blue Note, 1979)

With McCoy Tyner
 Tender Moments (Blue Note, 1968)
 Time for Tyner (Blue Note, 1969)
 Expansions (Blue Note, 1969)
 Cosmos (Blue Note, 1976)
 Asante (Blue Note, 1998)

With others
 The Crusaders, The Festival Album (Pacific Jazz, 1967)
 Chico Freeman, Tales of Ellington (BlackHawk, 1987)
 Dodo Greene, My Hour of Need (Blue Note, 1963)
 John Handy, Centerpiece (Milestone, 1989)
 Eddie Harris, A Tale of Two Cities (Night 1991)
 Andrew Hill, Mosaic Select 16: Andrew Hill (Blue Note, 2005)
 Richard "Groove" Holmes, Groove (Pacific Jazz, 1990)
 Harold Land, The Fox (Contemporary, 1960)
 Lenny McBrowne, Lenny McBrowne and the 4 Souls (Pacific Jazz, 1960)
 Tete Montoliu, Live at the Keystone Corner (Timeless, 1981)
 Dave Pike, Pike's Peak (Epic, 1962)
 Sonny Red, Sonny Red (Mainstream, 1971)
 Sam Rivers, A New Conception (Blue Note, 1966)
 Jerry Rusch, Rush Hour (Inner City, 1979)
 Clifford Scott, Out Front! (Pacific Jazz, 1963)
 Shirley Scott, Hip Soul (Prestige, 1961)
 Archie Shepp, California Meeting: Live on Broadway (Soul Note, 1987)
 Sonny Simmons, Backwoods Suite (West Wind, 1990)
 Stanley Turrentine, That's Where It's At (Blue Note, 1962)
 Mal Waldron, Left Alone '86 (Paddle Wheel, 1987)
 Cedar Walton, Three Sundays in the Seventies (Label M 2000)
 Gerald Wilson, On Stage (Pacific Jazz, 1965)

References

External links
Herbie Lewis Dies at 66 Obituary from JazzPolice.com

American jazz double-bassists
Male double-bassists
Hard bop double-bassists
New College of California
1941 births
2007 deaths
20th-century American musicians
20th-century double-bassists
20th-century American male musicians
American male jazz musicians
The Jazztet members